In the textile arts, a stitch  is a single turn or loop of thread, or yarn.  Stitches are the fundamental elements of sewing, knitting, embroidery, crochet, and needle lace-making, whether by hand or machine. A variety of stitches, each with one or more names, are used for specific purposes.

Sewing, embroidery, and lace

Examples include:
 Backstitch
 Overcast stitch
 Cross stitch
 Buttonhole or blanket stitch
 Chain stitch
 Knot stitch

These stitches and their variations are named according to the position of the needle and direction of sewing (running stitch, backstitch), the form or shape of the stitch (chain stitch, feather stitch) or the purpose of the stitch (tailor's tack, hem stitch).

Sewing machine stitches are classified by their structure: 
Chain stitch, made with one thread
Lockstitch, made with two threads
Overlock, made with one to five threads
Coverstitch, made with two or four threads (a twine)

More advanced machine stitches mimic traditional hand stitches using variations on the basic stitches.

Knitting

In knitting, a stitch is a single loop of yarn, secured to the loops beside it to form a row or course of stitches and to the loops above and below it to form a wale.

In securing the previous stitch in a wale, the next stitch can pass through the previous loop either from below or above. If the former, the stitch is denoted as a knit stitch or a plain stitch; if the latter, as a purl stitch. The two stitches are related in that a knit stitch seen from one side of the fabric appears as a purl stitch on the other side.

Crochet

In crochet, stitches are made by pulling a loop of thread through the work with a crochet hook.  Crochet stitches are named based on their structure. In the English-speaking crochet world, basic stitches have different names that vary by country. The differences are usually referred to as UK/US or British/American.

Notes

References
 
 

Textile arts
Sewing